Inape commoda is a species of moth of the family Tortricidae. It is found in Ecuador (Tungurahua and Napo Provinces).

References

External links

Moths described in 2006
Fauna of Ecuador
commoda
Moths of South America
Taxa named by Józef Razowski